In the mathematical field of topology, a section (or cross section) of a fiber bundle  is a continuous right inverse of the projection function . In other words, if   is a fiber bundle over a base space, :

then a section of that fiber bundle is a continuous map,

such that
 for all .

A section is an abstract characterization of what it means to be a graph.

Let  be the projection onto the first factor: .

The language of fibre bundles allows this notion of a section to be generalized to the case when  is not necessarily a Cartesian product. If  is a fibre bundle, then a section is a choice of point  in each of the fibres. (See image.)

Sections, particularly of principal bundles and vector bundles, are also very important tools in differential geometry. It is also useful in geometric analysis to consider spaces of sections with intermediate regularity (e.g.,  sections, or sections with regularity in the sense of Hölder conditions or Sobolev spaces).

Local and global sections 

Extending to global sections 

Sections are studied in homotopy theory and algebraic topology, where one of the main goals is to account for the existence or non-existence of global sections. An obstruction denies the existence of global sections since the space is too "twisted". More precisely, obstructions "obstruct" the possibility of extending a local section to a global section due to the space's "twistedness". Obstructions are indicated by particular characteristic classes, which are cohomological classes. For example, a principal bundle has a global section if and only if it is trivial. On the other hand, a vector bundle always has a global section, namely the zero section. However, it only admits a nowhere vanishing section if its Euler class is zero.

Generalizations 

Obstructions to extending local sections may be generalized in the following manner: take a topological space and form a category whose objects are open subsets, and morphisms are inclusions. Thus we use a category to generalize a topological space. We generalize the notion of a "local section" using sheaves of abelian groups, which assigns to each object an abelian group (analogous to local sections).

There is an important distinction here: intuitively, local sections are like "vector fields" on an open subset of a topological space. So at each point, an element of a fixed vector space is assigned. However, sheaves can "continuously change" the vector space (or more generally abelian group).

This entire process is really the global section functor, which assigns to each sheaf its global section. Then sheaf cohomology enables us to consider a similar extension problem while "continuously varying" the abelian group. The theory of characteristic classes generalizes the idea of obstructions to our extensions.

See also 
 Fibration
 Gauge theory
 Principal bundle
 Pullback bundle
 Vector bundle

Notes

References 
 Norman Steenrod, The Topology of Fibre Bundles, Princeton University Press (1951). .
 David Bleecker, Gauge Theory and Variational Principles, Addison-Wesley publishing, Reading, Mass (1981). .

External links 
 Fiber Bundle, PlanetMath
 

 
Differential topology
Algebraic topology
Homotopy theory